Andreas Voss may refer to:
 Andreas Voss (botanist) (1857-1924), German botanist
 Andreas Voss (footballer) (born 1979), German former football player